Elivia Ricci (later Ballotta, born 14 December 1936) is a retired Italian discus thrower who won a silver medal at the 1959 Summer Universiade. She competed at the 1960 Olympics and finished in 15th place.

Biography
Ricci is the wife of the former Italian pole vaulter Edmondo Ballotta.

National titles
Ricci won 14 national championships at senior level,
shot put: 1961, 1963, 1964, 1965, 1966 (5)
discus throw: 1958, 1959, 1960, 1961, 1962, 1963, 1964, 1965, 1966 (9)

References

External links
 

1936 births
Living people
Italian female discus throwers
Olympic athletes of Italy
Athletes (track and field) at the 1960 Summer Olympics
Universiade medalists in athletics (track and field)
Universiade silver medalists for Italy
Medalists at the 1959 Summer Universiade